Grange is a townland in County Westmeath, Ireland.

Grange is one of 10 townlands of the civil parish of Lackan in the barony of Corkaree in the Province of Leinster.

The neighbouring townlands are: Ballyharney to the north, Lackan to the east, Carrick to the south and Ballinalack and Cappagh to the west.

In the 1911 census of Ireland there were 3 houses and 18 inhabitants in the townland.

See also

There are two other townlands called Grange in County Westmeath:
Grange, Kilbixy
Grange, Kilcumreragh

References

External links
Grange at the IreAtlas Townland Data Base
Grange at Townlands.ie
Grange at Logainm.ie

Townlands of County Westmeath